The Yard Went On Forever is the second album by Richard Harris, released in 1968 by Dunhill Records (DS-50042). The album was written, arranged, and produced by Jimmy Webb.

Reception
A review of the album in Billboard said "Webb's material is treated with class and finesse" by Harris. Album track "Lucky Me" was described in the magazine as "a shimmering gem."

In his review on Allmusic, Bruce Eder praised the project, comparing it to the previous Richard Harris album, A Tramp Shining, and writing that "the lyrics are dazzling in their cascading imagery, the music is richer and more vividly conceived and recorded, and the entire album works magnificently."

Track listing
All songs were written by Jimmy Webb.

Side one
 "The Yard Went on Forever" – 5:43
 "Watermark" – 4:27
 "Interim" – 3:07
 "Gayla" – 3:19

Side two
 "The Hymns From The Grand Terrace" – 9:07
 "The Hive" – 3:59
 "Lucky Me" – 2:56
 "That's The Way It Was" – 3:00

Personnel
 Richard Harris - vocals
 Jimmy Webb – arranger, producer, piano
 Joe Osborn – bass
 Skip Mosher – flute
 Art Maebe – French horn
 David Duke – French horn
 George Price – French horn
 William Henshaw – French horn
 Mike Deasy – lead guitar
 Fred Tackett – rhythm guitar, trumpet
 Lance Wakely – rhythm guitar
 Larry Knechtel – harpsichord, organ, keyboards
 Hal Blaine – percussion
 Sid Sharp – strings
 Gary Coleman – timpani
 Milt Holland – timpani
 Frank Rosolino – trombone
 Lou Blackburn – trombone
 Bud Brisbois – trumpet
 Jules Chaikin – trumpet
Technical
Armin Steiner, William F. Williams - engineer
Gary Burden - art direction
Henry Diltz - photography

Chart performance

References 

Richard Harris albums
1968 albums
Dunhill Records albums
Albums produced by Jimmy Webb
Albums arranged by Jimmy Webb